KJIB-LP, VHF analog channel 6, was a low-powered television station licensed to Houston, Texas, United States. The station was owned by Roy Henderson. The station has minimal video modulation, with an offset of its audio modulation to 87.89 MHz. This allows individuals to listen to the TV channel at the lower end of the FM radio dial.

History

In 2013, New Beginnings Fellowship Church applied for a license to operate an LPFM radio station on 106.1 in Houston, Texas.  This application thwarted the plans of broadcaster Don Werlinger, who at the time was leasing a translator on 106.7 in Simonton, Texas.  He wanted to move his translator into Houston on 106.1.  As a solution, Werlinger promised that if the LPFM application was withdrawn, he would get the church permission to build and operate two analog LPTV stations. In 2008, facilities for KJIB-LP and KVDO-LP (channel 25) were destroyed by Hurricane Ike, but the licenses remained valid.  Werlinger represented to church officials that the license for channel 5 could easily be modified to Channel 6, and operate as a Franken FM station.

Ben Perez, an attorney claiming to represent licensee Roy Henderson, granted church officials permission to build and operate the LPTV stations at their own cost. In 2014, channel 5
(along with KVDO-LP) resumed operations programming classic music videos.
Subsequently, Abundant Life Christian Center in LaMarque, Texas, sought to purchase the license.  Roy Henderson claimed that Ben Perez was no longer his lawyer, and that he wasn't aware the stations were operational.  Through a different lawyer, he ordered the stations shut down.  Church officials then traveled to Washington, presenting FCC officials with recordings of phone calls, as well as evidence documenting the licensee lied to the FCC about the stations' operational status from 2005 to 2014.  To avoid a legal inquiry and possible perjury charges, the licensee simply surrendered the licenses for KJIB-LP and KVDO-LP.

The license was canceled on June 9, 2014.  Afterwards, the FCC closed their investigation under the legal theory: no license, nothing to review.

In reply, church officials notified the FCC that if Mr. Henderson surrendered and caused the cancellation of licenses that the church has a contractual right to operate, then Mr. Henderson is solely responsible for any unlicensed broadcasts.  Relying on state laws guaranteeing specific performance and enforcement of their contractual rights, church officials resumed operation of KJIB-LP. In an off the record statement, but nonetheless recorded, an FCC attorney advised church officials that as long as they are not causing harmful interference or broadcasting indecent material, that no enforcement action would be taken.

In 2015, KTDJ-LD (channel 5) was granted a modification to move from Dayton to Houston, Texas.  Church officials notified the FCC that, to avoid co-channel interference, they had no choice but to move to channel 6. Subsequently, KIPS-LD (channel 6) in Beaumont received special authorization from the FCC to revert from digital to analog, and began operating as radio station 87.7 La Ley that reached into the Houston market.

To avoid interference, church officials notified the FCC they had to discontinue video modulation, and offset their audio to 87.89 MHz. This enabled their signal to be received by ordinary FM radios tuned to 87.9.  Shortly thereafter, KIPS-LD asked to move to a tower closer to Houston, which was successfully opposed by the church.

In 2016, the FCC resident agent for Houston issued a Notice of Unlicensed Operation (NOUO) and conducted an inspection of KJIB-LP's facilities. Although there was no interference issues, he noted the transmission tower did not have a no hazard determination from the FAA, and that  the transmitter in use was emitting a spurious harmonic on an unused Cable TV frequency.  When the agent was provided a copy of the cancelled KJIB-LP license, and advised of the legal issues, he stated that these matters were above his pay grade. The agent clearly advised that "[a]t this time I'm not ordering you to shut the transmitter down, I'm not ordering you to do anything." Subsequently, after being provided with evidence of a no hazard determination and installation of a low-pass filter, he advised he was closing the NOUO investigation.

In an attempt to obtain a new license for the 87.9 operation, church officials applied for an experimental license that the FCC denied.

In May 2018, KCVH-LD applied to move from channel 30 to channel 6.  Church officials opposed the proposed KCVH-LD move in a petition to deny. Afterwards, a different FCC agent issued a new NOUO making exactly the same allegation as the first one. Church officials replied that they have a valid white space registration to operate two unlicensed devices on Channel 6, and that in any event  double jeopardy protections prohibit the FCC from pursuing a second NOUO case after the first one was dismissed.

In 2019, KCVH-LD agreed to channel share, granting New Beginnings exclusive right to program a subchannel.  In 2021, JoeTV commenced broadcasting on channel 6-9.

References

External links

Television stations in Texas
Defunct television stations in the United States
Television channels and stations disestablished in 2014
2014 disestablishments in Texas
JIB-LP